The 2010 Aegon Classic was a women's tennis tournament played on outdoor grass courts. It was the 29th edition of the event. It took place at the Edgbaston Priory Club in Birmingham, United Kingdom from 7 June until 13 June 2010. First-seeded Li Na won the singles title.

Finals

Singles

 Li Na defeated  Maria Sharapova 7–5, 6–1
It was Li's first title of the year and 3rd of her career.

Doubles

 Cara Black /  Lisa Raymond defeated  Liezel Huber /  Bethanie Mattek-Sands 6–3, 3–2, RET

Entrants

Seeds

 Seedings are based on the rankings as of May 24, 2010.

Other entrants
The following players received wildcards into the main draw:
  Naomi Broady
  Anne Keothavong
  Melanie South
  Heather Watson

The following players received entry from the qualifying draw:
  Misaki Doi
  Ekaterina Dzehalevich
  Kaia Kanepi
  Sesil Karatantcheva
  Michaëlla Krajicek
  Mirjana Lučić
  Alison Riske
  Laura Robson

The following player received a lucky loser spot:
  Sophie Ferguson

External links
Official website

Aegon Classic
Aegon Classic
Birmingham Classic (tennis)
Aegon Classic
Birm